António Manuel Frasco Vieira (born 16 January 1955), known as Frasco, is a Portuguese former footballer who played as an attacking midfielder.

Best known for his 11-year spell with Porto, he appeared in more than 300 official matches for the club and won a total of 13 major titles. He was chosen by Portuguese sports newspaper Record as one of the best 100 Portuguese football players ever.

Frasco earned more than 20 caps for Portugal, representing the nation at Euro 1984.

Club career
Frasco was born in Leça da Palmeira. In spite of a short height his first sport was basketball, but Óscar Marques, a scout from Leixões SC, discovered him and took him to the club. He made his debut in the first-team – and the Primeira Liga, a competition in which he would spend 15 of his 17 years as a professional – at the age of 18, contributing with ten games as the Matosinhos side barely avoided relegation.

Frasco eventually imposed himself in the first team, as a starter, as Leixões suffered relegation in 1977. In the following year's off-season, however, he signed for FC Porto after a failed transfer to S.L. Benfica two years earlier. In his first season with the José Maria Pedroto-led side he played all 30 matches as the team won the national championship, scoring a career-best six goals in the following campaign, with the league being narrowly lost to Sporting CP as the domestic cup to Benfica.

After 1986, Frasco began suffering from successive small injuries which diminished his importance in the squad. He still appeared in seven games in Porto's victorious campaign in the European Cup, including 25 minutes in the final against FC Bayern Munich (2–1), eventually leaving in June 1989 at the age of 34.

Frasco then worked as a manager, coaching several teams in no higher than the second division. He returned to main club Porto in 2006 and worked with several of its youth sides, always as assistant.

International career
On 17 October 1979, Frasco made his debut for Portugal, in a 0–2 loss against Belgium in Brussels for the UEFA Euro 1980 qualifiers. He was one of the most influential players in the successful Euro 1984 campaign, taking part in all the matches as the national team reached the semi-finals and assisting Nené for the only goal against Romania in the group stage.

Over eight years, Frasco played 23 times and scored once.

|}

Honours
Porto
Primeira Divisão: 1978–79, 1984–85, 1985–86, 1987–88
Taça de Portugal: 1983–84, 1987–88
Supertaça Cândido de Oliveira: 1983, 1984, 1986
European Cup: 1986–87
European Super Cup: 1987
Intercontinental Cup: 1987

Notes
DIAS, Rui, Record – 100 Melhores do Futebol Português – Volume I (Record – The 100 best of Portuguese Football, 2002, EDISPORT

References

External links

1955 births
Living people
Portuguese footballers
Association football midfielders
Primeira Liga players
Liga Portugal 2 players
Leixões S.C. players
FC Porto players
Portugal under-21 international footballers
Portugal international footballers
UEFA Euro 1984 players
Portuguese football managers
Liga Portugal 2 managers
C.D. Feirense managers
C.D. Aves managers
Sportspeople from Matosinhos